The 20th parallel north is a circle of latitude that is 20 degrees north of the Earth's equatorial plane. It crosses Africa, Asia, the Indian Ocean, the Pacific Ocean, North America, the Caribbean and the Atlantic Ocean.

The parallel defines part of the border between Libya and Sudan. Within Sudan it defines the border between the Northern and North Darfur states.

At this latitude the sun is visible for 13 hours, 21 minutes during the summer solstice and 10 hours, 55 minutes during the winter solstice.

On 21 June, the maximum altitude of the sun is 93.44 degrees and 46.56 degrees on 21 December.

Around the world
Starting at the Prime Meridian and heading eastwards, the parallel 20° north passes through:

{| class="wikitable plainrowheaders"
! scope="col" width="125" | Co-ordinates
! scope="col" | Country, territory or sea
! scope="col" | Notes
|-
| 
! scope="row" | 
|
|-
| 
! scope="row" | 
|
|-
| 
! scope="row" | 
|
|-
| 
! scope="row" | 
|
|-
| 
! scope="row" | 
|
|-
| 
! scope="row" |  /  border
|
|-valign="top"
| 
! scope="row" | 
| The parallel defines the border between the Northern and North Darfur states
|-
| style="background:#b0e0e6;" | 
! scope="row" style="background:#b0e0e6;" | Indian Ocean
| style="background:#b0e0e6;" | Red Sea
|-
| 
! scope="row" | 
|
|-
| 
! scope="row" | 
|
|-
| style="background:#b0e0e6;" | 
! scope="row" style="background:#b0e0e6;" | Indian Ocean
| style="background:#b0e0e6;" | Arabian Sea - Passing just south of Masirah Island, 
|-valign="top"
| 
! scope="row" | 
| Maharashtra Chhattisgarh Odisha Chhattisgarh Odisha
|-
| style="background:#b0e0e6;" | 
! scope="row" style="background:#b0e0e6;" | Indian Ocean
| style="background:#b0e0e6;" | Bay of Bengal
|-
| 
! scope="row" |  (Burma)
|
|-
| 
! scope="row" | 
|
|-
| 
! scope="row" | 
|
|-
| 
! scope="row" | 
|
|-
| style="background:#b0e0e6;" | 
! scope="row" style="background:#b0e0e6;" | Pacific Ocean
| style="background:#b0e0e6;" | Gulf of Tonkin, South China Sea
|-
| 
! scope="row" | 
| Island of Hainan — passing just south of Haikou
|-
| style="background:#b0e0e6;" | 
! scope="row" style="background:#b0e0e6;" | Pacific Ocean
| style="background:#b0e0e6;" | South China Sea
|-valign="top"
| style="background:#b0e0e6;" | 
! scope="row" style="background:#b0e0e6;" | Pacific Ocean
| style="background:#b0e0e6;" | Philippine Sea - Passing between the Batanes and Babuyan islands at the Balintang Channel,  - Passing just south of the Maug Islands,  into an unnamed part of the Ocean
|-
| 
! scope="row" | 
| Big Island, Hawaii
|-
| style="background:#b0e0e6;" | 
! scope="row" style="background:#b0e0e6;" | Pacific Ocean
| style="background:#b0e0e6;" |
|-
| 
! scope="row" | 
| JaliscoMichoacanGuanajuatoQuerétaroMexico StateHidalgoPueblaVeracruz
|-
| style="background:#b0e0e6;" | 
! scope="row" style="background:#b0e0e6;" | Gulf of Mexico
| style="background:#b0e0e6;" | Bay of Campeche
|-
| 
! scope="row" | 
| CampecheYucatánQuintana Roo
|-
| style="background:#b0e0e6;" | 
! scope="row" style="background:#b0e0e6;" | Caribbean Sea
| style="background:#b0e0e6;" |
|-
| 
! scope="row" | 
|
|-
| style="background:#b0e0e6;" | 
! scope="row" style="background:#b0e0e6;" | Caribbean Sea
| style="background:#b0e0e6;" | Windward Passage
|-
| 
! scope="row" | 
| Island of Tortuga
|-
| style="background:#b0e0e6;" | 
! scope="row" style="background:#b0e0e6;" | Atlantic Ocean
| style="background:#b0e0e6;" | Passing just north of the island of Hispaniola, 
|-
| 
! scope="row" | 
|
|-
| 
! scope="row" | 
|
|}

See also
19th parallel north
21st parallel north

References

n20
Libya–Sudan border